The Ningxia Museum is a museum in Jinfeng District, Yinchuan, Ningxia, China.

History
The original museum building was prepared in 1959 and built in 1973. Construction of a new museum building started in November 2006. The museum was re-opened on 28 August 2008 and the old site was closed.

Architecture
The museum building is a three-story building with a total floor area of 30,258 m2. It consists of eight exhibition halls. The building was constructed resembling the Hui character.

Exhibitions
The museum displays more than 10,000 cultural relics.

See also 
 List of museums in China

References

External links 

  

Museums in Ningxia
1973 establishments in China
Museums established in 1973
National first-grade museums of China
Yinchuan